Transilvania Motor Ring is a 3.7 km racing circuit located 20 km south–west of Târgu Mureș, in the historical region of Transylvania. It is the largest racing venue in Romania.

References

External links
 Official site

Târgu Mureș
Sport in Romania